Železničná spoločnosť Cargo Slovakia, a. s. (ZSSK CARGO, VKM: ZSSKC) is the Slovak state-owned freight train operator based in Bratislava. It was established on 1st January 2005 by separating Železničná spoločnosť into two different companies – one intended to operate passenger trains (ZSSK) and the other one freight trains. Its establisher and the only shareholder is the Republic of Slovakia, which acts via the Ministry of Transport and Construction.

ZSSK CARGO's market share in Slovakia is about 80%, and in comparison to the other freight train operators, ZSSK CARGO has the best coverage of the Slovak territory.

Activity 
The ZSSK CARGO's main business activity is providing rail freight transport services. The company also repairs and maintains rail traction vehicles and freight carriages and performs rail vehicle safety inspections, examinations, tests and measurements. Other services include renting of traction vehicles and freight carriages, road transport or ensuring of contract conclusion related to UIC or EUR trademark usage to repair or produce pallets.

Product portfolio 

 freight transport: transport of single carriages, group of carriages and unit trains, certified logistics trains, intermodal transport, transport of automobiles and waste
 siding services
 transshipment services
 auxiliary services: transport of special consignments, safety advisor services, procurement services related to transport (e.g. operations of customs procedures, sealing of carriages, posting of consignment instead of the consignor etc.)
 maintenance and repairs of railway vehicles: maintenance and repairs of traction vehicles and freight carriages, changes in construction and design, inspections, examinations, testing and measurements of railway vehicles, mobile services (performing repairs directly during operation) etc.

Certificates 
The company is a holder of certificates in compliance with the standards:

 STN EN ISO 9001:2016 on the products:
 Rail freight transport (logistic trains).
 Maintenance and repairs of rolling stock. 
 Procurement and Purchase Processes. Methods and Analysis Processes. Storage Processes and Services. Fleet of vehicles Processes and Services.
 East Slovak Transshipment Yards.
 Ensuring professional qualification and education of employees.
 STN ISO 45001:2019 on the product:
 Managerial system of work safety and health protection at work in ZSSK CARGO.

Transport 
Since 2012, ZSSK CARGO transports about 35–36 million tons of goods per year. Before the Great Recession, the amount reached the point of 50 million tons per year. The largest proportion of transported goods holds iron ore (about 35%), the other most transported goods include metals, coal, building materials, petroleum products, wood and chemicals.

See also 

 Transport in Slovakia
 Rail transport in Slovakia
 Železnice Slovenskej republiky
 Železničná spoločnosť Slovensko

External links 

 official page
 Certificate of Incorporation

Railway companies of Slovakia
Slovak brands